The Politics of Serbia are defined by a unitary parliamentary framework that is defined by the Constitution of Serbia in which the president, currently Aleksandar Vučić, is the head of state while the prime minister, currently Ana Brnabić, is the head of government. Executive power is exercised by the Serbian government and the President of Serbia. Legislative power is vested in the unicameral National Assembly which is composed of 250 proportionally elected deputies. The judiciary is independent and is headed by the Supreme Court of Cassation, which is also the highest court in Serbia.

The Serbian political system uses a multi-party system. The first political parties and organizations were established in the first half of the 19th century but they were officially registered as political parties in 1881. The People's Radical Party (NRS) dominated Serbian and Yugoslav politics from the late 1880s until 1928. Serbia was a part of the Kingdom of Serbs, Croats and Slovenes (later known as the Kingdom of Yugoslavia) from 1918 until 1941. During the period of German occupation the government was independent and was mostly run by military personnel, right-wing politicians and former members of the fascist Yugoslav National Movement (ZBOR). After World War II, Serbia was re-established as a one-party state and as one of the constituent republics of the communist Yugoslavia, which was headed by the League of Communists of Serbia (SKS). After the dissolution of SFR Yugoslavia in 1992, Serbia became a part of the Federal Republic of Yugoslavia and until 2000, it was under the dominant rule of the Socialist Party of Serbia (SPS). Since 2012, the populist Serbian Progressive Party (SNS) has been the ruling party of Serbia and it established dominant power in Serbian politics including shifting to authoritarianism, and the repression of the Serbian opposition.

The President of the Republic besides being the head of state is also the commander in chief of the Serbian armed forces and is directly elected based on popular vote to serve a five-year term, but constitutionally the president has little governing power and is primarily a ceremonial position. The current president Aleksandar Vučić serves de facto under a semi-presidential system. The government which is headed by the prime minister and currently has four deputy prime ministers in total including the first deputy prime minister position which is currently occupied by Ivica Dačić. The unicameral National Assembly has 250 seats in total and the members of the parliament are elected by popular vote to serve four-year terms. A party must receive at least 3% of the popular vote in the entire country to qualify for any seats, except the minority parties who only have to reach 0.4% of the popular vote. The ruling SNS-led coalition has 106 seats in the parliament, while the government parties in total have 155 seats which leaves the opposition with 90 seats. Besides the parliamentary and presidential elections, Serbia also holds local, regional elections and provincial elections.

Serbian Progressive Party (SNS) won in the 2014 election and the leader of SNS Aleksandar Vučić became prime minister. Three years later he moved to the presidency. Ana Brnabic has been prime minister since 2017, but president Vučić has kept a firm hold on executive power.

In June 2020, Serbia's ruling Progressive Party (SNS) won a landslide victory in parliamentary elections. Main opposition groups boycotted the vote. According to the opposition the conditions were not free and fair. 

In April 2022, President Aleksandar Vučić was re-elected, and SNS-led coalition maintained parliamentary plurality, but no longer has the majority on its own. Third cabinet of Ana Brnabić was formed on 26 October 2022, and contains 29 members, including ministers without portfolio, deputy prime ministers, and the prime minister.

Legal framework

Executive 
Executive power is exercised by the prime minister, who heads a cabinet. The prime minister is chosen by the National Assembly on the proposal of the president, who names the designate after consultations with all parliamentary leaders. The president is elected based on popular vote, but has little governing power and is primarily a ceremonial position. The president’s term lasts five years and can be elected for at most 2 terms. Cabinet ministers are nominated by the prime minister and confirmed by the National Assembly. Governing power is vested in the prime minister, deputy prime ministers and other ministers. The prime minister is responsible for presenting their agenda to the National Assembly as well as proposing the ministers to fill the cabinet posts in their government. The government is considered elected if it has been elected by a majority vote of all representatives in the National Assembly.

|President
|Aleksandar Vučić
|Serbian Progressive Party
|31 May 2017
|-
|Prime Minister
|Ana Brnabić
|Serbian Progressive Party
|29 June 2017
|}

Legislature 

Legislative power is vested in the unicameral parliament known as the National Assembly, which is composed of 250 proportionally elected deputies by secret ballot. The National Assembly also wields constitutional authority in the republic balls of Serbia.

Judiciary 
The judicial system of Serbia is headed by the Supreme Court of Cassation. The court reviews and possibly rules on past court cases made at the lower court levels. The 2008 Law on Organization of Courts greatly decreased the number of courts in Serbia - from 168,000 to 6,400. In addition, many different court tiers were established: the Basic, High, and Appellate Court and as previously mentioned, the Supreme Court of Cassation.

Parties and elections 

Serbia uses the multi-party system, with numerous political parties in which no one party often has a chance of gaining power alone, this results in the formation of coalition governments. Elections are held on the parliamentary, provincial and local level, and are scheduled every four years, while presidential elections are scheduled every five years.

International Organizations 

UN, OSCE, Council of Europe, BSEC, NATO Partnership for Peace, CEFTA, ICC, IMF, World Bank, Southeast European Cooperation Process, Stability Pact for Southeastern Europe, Southeast European Cooperative Initiative, Central European Initiative.

Serbia was granted candidate status for membership in the European Union (EU) and it submitted its application 4 years earlier. Serbia made progress in meeting the criteria established by the European in recent years. For example, Serbia provided majority municipalities in Kosovo with broad powers in education, healthcare and spatial planning.

It is also a candidate for the World Trade Organization (WTO) and was expected to join by 2013.

Status of Kosovo 

Kosovo, on the other hand, has been deemed a United Nations protectorate since 1999. On 17 February 2008 ethnic Albanians in the region declared Kosovo’s independence and sought the recognition of foreign nations. The Serbian government did not recognize this attempted demand for independence and saw and is null under the UN Charter and the Serbian constitution. Although the Serbian government has stated it shall not acknowledge Kosovo’s independence, it has stated that Serbia wants a “normal life for all the people in Kosovo".

See also 
 List of political parties in Serbia
 Constitution of Serbia
 List of Ambassadors from Serbia

References 

Politics of Serbia